Rangchhati Union is a union of Kalmakanda Upazila in Netrakona District.

Geography 
Its total area is 
56.757161 km2.

Demographics 
According to the 2011 Bangladesh census, Rangchhati had a population of 36503. Males constituted 50.35% of the population and females 49.65%.

Administration 
Rangchhati has 9 wards and 52 villages.
List of ward based villages:—

Education system
According to the 2011 Bangladesh census, Rangchhati Union had a literacy rate of 21.81%. At this time, there are 3 Secondary Schools, 1 Lower Secondary School, 18 Govt. Primary Schools, 1 Alia Madrasa, 4 Ibtadei Madrasas and renowned non-government organization BRAC's primary schools in the Union. There are also other NGO Primary Schools and Qawmi Madrasas.

Educational Institutions
 Secondary School 
 Munshipur Haji Israil Islami High School 
 Rangchhati Dwimukhi High School 
 Baruakona Saint Fradaric High School 
 Lower Secondary School 
  Bottola Junior School 
 Alia Madrasa 
 Rangchhati Dakhil Madrasa
 Govt Primary School 
 Munshipur Govt Primary School 
 South Munshipur Govt Primary School 
 Kalaikandi Govt Primary School 
 Omorgaon Govt Primary School 
 Omorgaon Shahjahan Govt Primary School 
 Rangchhati Govt Primary School 
 Amgara Govt Primary School 
 Khushikura Govt Primary School 
 Choita Govt Primary School 
 Bishauti Govt Primary School 
 Ramnathpur Govt Primary School 
 Baruakona Govt Primary School 
 Bottola Govt Primary School 
 Garampara Govt Primary School 
 Shahid Smriti Teratoopa Baghber Govt Primary School 
 Krisnopur Govt Primary School 
Nollapara Community Govt Primary School 
 Rajnagar Govt Primary School 
 Ibtedei Madrasa 
 Pechamari Ibtedei Madrasa 
 Choitanoyapara Ibtedei Madrasa 
 Banaikona Ibtedei Madrasa 
 Nollapara Ibtedei Madrasa 
 NGO 
 BRAC & others 
 Qawmi Madrasa 
 Munshipur Rajjakiya Hafijia Eyatimkhana Madrasa 
 Munshupur Shahidiya Fayjul Ulum Madrasa 
 Horinakuri Noorani Ideal (Residential) Madrasa 
 Rangchhati Qawmi Madrasa

Organisation 

 Islamic Organisations. 
 Al Ittihad Islami Jonokollyan Porishad 
 Khademul Islam Porishad 
 Youth Organisations 
 Munshipur Purbopara Ekota Juba Unnoyon Songothon

Communication system 
From Kalmakanda Upazila, Roadway is the main communication system of Rangchhati Union. By the Motorcycles & battery operated Auto-rickshaws, more than 8 kilometers north from Kalmakanda Upazila, crossing the College Road and Panchgaon Border Road, people can be reached Rangchhati Union.

See more 
 Kalmakanda Upazila 
 Durgapur Upazila, Netrokona
 Netrakona

References 

Netrokona District